Hermus is a surname. Notable people with the surname include:

 Antony Hermus (born 1973), Dutch conductor
 Milou Hermus (1947–2021), Dutch artist
 Randee Hermus (born 1979), Canadian soccer player